Lesotho has 371 Boy Scouts served by the Lesotho Scout Association. Founded in 1936, it became a member of the World Organization of the Scout Movement in 1971.

As Lesotho is a small, mountainous country with difficult communication links, Scouting's growth is often difficult. Although the association is small, they have attended several World Jamborees. One Scout participated in the 19th World Jamboree in Chile in 1998.

In January 2016, Lesotho Scouts Association signed a Memorandum of Understanding with the Scouting Ireland. The countries will participate in a partnership called Lumela-Fáilte, based on intercultural sharing. The partnership has been in progress since 2010, with Scouting Ireland supporting two Basotho Rover Scouts to attend the 2015 World Scout Jamboree in Japan.

Ideals

Scout Law
 A Scout is to be trusted
 A Scout is loyal
 A Scout is friendly and considerate
 A Scout belongs to the worldwide family of Scouts
 A Scout has courage in all difficulties
 A Scout makes good use of time and is careful of possessions and property
 A Scout has self-respect and respect for others

Scout Promise

See also
Lesotho Girl Guides Association
Scouts South Africa
Swaziland Boy Scouts Association

References

External links
 Berea Scouts Association- subregion of the Lesotho Scouts Association

World Organization of the Scout Movement member organizations
Scouting and Guiding in Lesotho
Youth organizations established in 1936